Magdalena Valerio Cordero (born 27 September 1959), is a Spanish legal expert and politician, of the PSOE, that has spent most of her political career in the autonomous community of Castilla-La Mancha. She currently serves as president of the Council of State since 2022. Previously, she was Minister of Labour, Migrations and Social Security of the Government of Spain between 2018 and 2020, when she was succeeded by Yolanda Díaz and José Luis Escrivá.

Biography

Origins and career 
Born in Torremocha, province of Cáceres, on 27 September 1959, she studied Law at the Complutense University of Madrid, graduating there in 1985. She has been a resident of Guadalajara since 1989. She worked as an exam coach and Area coordinator of Labour and Social Security in the Centro de Estudios Velázquez-ADAMS between 1986-1990. She is an officer of the Social Security Management Body and the Employment Management Scale of the INEM (National Employment Sistem). She also worked as head of the Bureau of Personnel in the Provincial Directorate of the INSERSO (Old Age and Social Services Institute) of Guadalajara between 1991-1994 and later as Deputy Director of Economic-Administrative Management and provincial secretary of the INSALUD of Guadalajara between 1994 and 1999.

Political career 
In the 1999 local elections she was elected councillor in the Guadalajara City Council, and was re-elected in 2003 when she was appointed second deputy mayor and councillor for Economy, Finance, Procurement, Heritage and Citizen Participation. In September 2005 she was appointed Minister of Labor and Employment of Castilla-La Mancha and, in 2007, Minister of Tourism and Handicrafts. In September 2008 she became the regional Minister for Public Administration and Justice. In the regional elections of 2007 she headed the list of the PSOE for Guadalajara, winning a seat in the Regional Cortes.

In July 2008 she was elected a member of the Regional Executive Committee of the PSOE of CLM and in October of the same year was elected General Secretary of the Municipal Executive Committee of Guadalajara Capital. Also, from 2000 to 2012 she was a member of the Regional Committee of the PSOE of CLM. In May 2010 she stood down from the Government Council to be appointed a delegate to the Board of Communities of Castilla-La Mancha. That same year she won the primaries to be a PSOE candidate for the Guadalajara City Council. After the Socialist defeat in the elections of 2011, she went on to lead the opposition at City Hall.

Heading the PSOE ticket in Guadalajara in the general elections of 2011, she won a seat in Cortes Generales.

Minister of Labour, Migrations and Social Security 
The new Spanish Prime Minister, Pedro Sánchez, following the motion of censure that the PSOE tabled against the previous government of Mariano Rajoy (PP) and that was carried on 1 June 2018, appointed her as Minister in the new Spanish government. Felipe VI sanctioned by royal decree her appointment as holder of the portfolio of Minister of Labour, Migrations and Social Security. On 7 June she was sworn into office before the King at Zarzuela Palace.

In February 2020 she was chosen by the Socialist group to chair the "Pacto de Toledo" Parliamentary Committee for Pension Reform.

References

External links

1973 births
21st-century Spanish women politicians
Complutense University of Madrid alumni
Government ministers of Castilla–La Mancha
Government ministers of Spain
Guadalajara, Spain municipal councillors
Living people
Members of the 10th Congress of Deputies (Spain)
Members of the 13th Congress of Deputies (Spain)
Members of the 7th Cortes of Castilla–La Mancha
Members of the Cortes of Castilla–La Mancha from Guadalajara
People from the Province of Cáceres
Spanish jurists
Spanish Socialist Workers' Party politicians
Women government ministers of Spain
Women members of the Congress of Deputies (Spain)
Members of the 14th Congress of Deputies (Spain)